434th may refer to:

434th Air Refueling Wing, one of the key refueling units in the US Air Force Reserve
434th Bombardment Squadron, an inactive United States Air Force unit
434th Fighter Training Squadron (434 FTS), part of the 47th Flying Training Wing based at Laughlin Air Force Base, Texas
434th Operations Group, an active United States Air Force Reserve unit

See also
434 (number)
434, the year 434 (CDXXXIV) of the Julian calendar
434 BC